Home Is the Exile is a novel by the American writer Hilary Masters set in 1990s Pittsburgh, Pennsylvania.

The novel weaves the stories of two military men of two eras: aviator Roy Armstrong is a veteran of the Republican cause in the Spanish Civil War, while Walt Hardy, a player in the Iran-Contra Affair, has returned to contemporary Pittsburgh, where he grew up.

References

1996 American novels
Novels set in Pittsburgh
Permanent Press (publisher) books